Davide Mandelli (born 28 June 1977) is a former Italian footballer who played as defender.

Playing career
He started his career with his local club Monza. After playing with other lower league clubs, he joined Torino, followed by Siena and Chievo.

He made his European debut against S.C. Braga in 2006-07 UEFA Cup.

Coaching career
Following retirement, Mandelli took on a coaching career alongside former teammate Michele Marcolini, working as his assistant on a number of clubs such as Real Vicenza, Pavia, Santarcangelo, Chievo and Novara.

He spent the 2021–22 season as assistant to Marcolini at AlbinoLeffe. On May 24, 2022, was relinquished from his position, together with Marcolini and the whole coaching staff.

Honours

Player

Biellese
Campionato Nazionale Dilettanti: 1996–97

Torino
Serie B: 2000–01

AC Siena
Serie B: 2002–03

Chievo Verona
Serie B: 2007–08

References

External links
chievoverona.it

1977 births
Living people
Italian footballers
S.S.D. Varese Calcio players
Torino F.C. players
A.C.N. Siena 1904 players
A.C. ChievoVerona players
Serie A players
Serie B players
Association football defenders
Sportspeople from Monza
A.S.D. La Biellese players
Footballers from Lombardy